Carlo Osti (born January 20, 1958, in Vittorio Veneto) is a retired Italian professional football player.

Honours
 Serie A champion: 1980/81, 1981/82.

1958 births
Living people
People from Vittorio Veneto
Italian footballers
Italy under-21 international footballers
Serie A players
Udinese Calcio players
Atalanta B.C. players
Juventus F.C. players
U.S. Avellino 1912 players
Piacenza Calcio 1919 players
Virtus Bergamo Alzano Seriate 1909 players
Association football defenders
Footballers from Veneto
Sportspeople from the Province of Treviso